In mathematics, a Diophantine equation is an equation of the form P(x1, ..., xj, y1, ..., yk) = 0 (usually abbreviated P() = 0) where P() is a polynomial with integer coefficients, where x1, ..., xj indicate parameters and y1, ..., yk  indicate unknowns.

That is, a parameter value is in the Diophantine set S if and only if the associated Diophantine equation is satisfiable under that parameter value. The use of natural numbers both in S and the existential quantification merely reflects the usual applications in computability and model theory. It does not matter whether natural numbers refer to the set of nonnegative integers or positive integers since the two definitions for Diophantine set are equivalent. We can also equally well speak of Diophantine sets of integers and freely replace quantification over natural numbers with quantification over the integers. However, whether quantification over rationals can also be substituted for quantification over the integers is a notoriously hard open problem.

The MRDP theorem (so named for the initials of the four principal contributors to its solution) states that a set of integers is Diophantine if and only if it is computably enumerable. A set of integers S is computably enumerable if and only if there is an algorithm that, when given an integer, halts if that integer is a member of S and runs forever otherwise. This means that the concept of general Diophantine set, apparently belonging to number theory, can be taken rather in logical or recursion-theoretic terms. This is far from obvious, however, and represented the culmination of some decades of work.

Matiyasevich's completion of the MRDP theorem settled Hilbert's tenth problem. Hilbert's tenth problem was to find a general algorithm which can decide whether a given Diophantine equation has a solution among the integers.  While Hilbert's tenth problem is not a formal mathematical statement as such, the nearly universal acceptance of the (philosophical) identification of a decision algorithm with a total computable predicate allows us to use the MRDP theorem to conclude that the tenth problem is unsolvable.

Examples
In the following examples, the natural numbers refer to the set of positive integers.

The equation

is an example of a Diophantine equation with a parameter x and unknowns y1 and y2. The equation has a solution in y1 and y2 precisely when x can be expressed as a product of two integers greater than 1, in other words x is a composite number. Namely, this equation provides a Diophantine definition of the set

{4, 6, 8, 9, 10, 12, 14, 15, 16, 18, ...}

consisting of the composite numbers.

Other examples of Diophantine definitions are as follows:
 The equation  with parameter x and unknowns y1, y2 only has solutions in  when x is a sum of two perfect squares. The Diophantine set of the equation is {2, 5, 8, 10, 13, 17, 18, 20, 25, 26, ...}.
 The equation  with parameter x and unknowns y1, y2. This is a Pell equation, meaning it only has solutions in  when x is not a perfect square. The Diophantine set is {2, 3, 5, 6, 7, 8, 10, 11, 12, 13, ...}. 
 The equation  is a Diophantine equation with two parameters x1, x2 and an unknown y, which defines the set of pairs (x1, x2) such that x1 < x2.

Matiyasevich's theorem

Matiyasevich's theorem, also called the Matiyasevich–Robinson–Davis–Putnam or MRDP theorem, says:

Every computably enumerable set is Diophantine, and the converse.

A set S of integers is computably enumerable if there is an algorithm such that: For each integer input n, if n is a member of S, then the algorithm eventually halts; otherwise it runs forever.  That is equivalent to saying there is an algorithm that runs forever and lists the members of S.  A set S is Diophantine precisely if there is some polynomial with integer coefficients f(n, x1, ..., xk)
such that an integer n is in S if and only if there exist some integers
x1, ..., xk
such that f(n, x1, ..., xk) = 0.

Conversely, every Diophantine set is computably enumerable:
consider a Diophantine equation f(n, x1, ..., xk) = 0.
Now we make an algorithm which simply tries all possible values for
n, x1, ..., xk (in, say, some simple order consistent with the increasing order of the sum of their absolute values),
and prints n every time f(n, x1, ..., xk) = 0.
This algorithm will obviously run forever and will list exactly the n
for which f(n, x1, ..., xk) = 0 has a solution
in x1, ..., xk.

Proof technique

Yuri Matiyasevich utilized a method involving Fibonacci numbers, which grow exponentially, in order to show that solutions to Diophantine equations may grow exponentially. Earlier work by Julia Robinson, Martin Davis and Hilary Putnam – hence, MRDP – had shown that this suffices to show that every computably enumerable set is Diophantine.

Application to Hilbert's tenth problem
Hilbert's tenth problem asks for a general algorithm deciding the solvability of Diophantine equations. The conjunction of Matiyasevich's result with the fact that most recursively enumerable languages are not decidable implies that a solution to Hilbert's tenth problem is impossible.

Refinements

Later work has shown that the question of solvability of a Diophantine equation is undecidable even if the equation only has 9 natural number variables (Matiyasevich, 1977) or 11 integer variables (Zhi Wei Sun, 1992).

Further applications

Matiyasevich's theorem has since been used to prove that many problems from calculus and differential equations are unsolvable.

One can also derive the following stronger form of Gödel's first incompleteness theorem from Matiyasevich's result:

Corresponding to any given consistent axiomatization of number theory, one can explicitly construct a Diophantine equation which has no solutions, but such that this fact cannot be proved within the given axiomatization.

According to the incompleteness theorems, a powerful-enough consistent axiomatic theory is incomplete, meaning the truth of some of its propositions cannot be established within its formalism. The statement above says that this incompleteness must include the solvability of a diophantine equation, assuming that the theory in question is a number theory.

Notes

References

  English translation in Soviet Mathematics 11 (2), pp. 354–357.

External links 
 Matiyasevich theorem article on Scholarpedia.
 Diophantine Set article on PlanetMath.

Diophantine equations
Hilbert's problems

fr:Diophantien
it:Teorema di Matiyasevich
he:הבעיה העשירית של הילברט
pt:Teorema de Matiyasevich
ru:Диофантово множество